The Battle of Sacheon was a naval engagement on May 29, 1592 (Gregorian: July 8, 1592) during the Imjin War (1592–98). It occurred at Sacheon where Yi Sunsin's fleet managed to destroy 13 large Japanese ships. It was the first battle of Admiral Yi's 2nd Campaign in the Imjin War, between Japan and Korea, when the turtle ship was first used.

Prelude
Yi Sunsin received news from Won Gyun that the Japanese were already at Sacheon and the surrounding area. Fearing that they were planning an attack on Yeosu, Yi Sunsin set sail with 26 warships on May 29 (Gregorian: July 8). He met up with Won Gyun at Noryang and ordered him to mop up stragglers after the battle and then approached Sacheon.

Situation at Sacheon
Admiral Yi scrutinized the surrounding area. A large cliff overlooked the city and Japanese soldiers seemed to move about everywhere in the city. Twelve very large Japanese warships were anchored in the harbor, along with numerous other smaller ships. Admiral Yi knew that he could not attack the Japanese in a spearhead assault because he knew that the Japanese could direct arquebus fire down on the Koreans from the top of the cliffs.

Admiral Yi wanted to fight the Japanese in the sea where there was more room to maneuver. Hoping to draw the Japanese into open waters, he turned his battleships around and withdrew. Apparently, the Japanese commander had been observing the Korean movements and quickly ordered his captains to take a portion of the fleet anchored at Sacheon and attack the Koreans when he saw them withdraw. Taking the bait, the Japanese pursued the Koreans.

The turtle ship
The Battle of Sacheon was the first battle during which Admiral Yi deployed the turtle ship. By the time the Koreans and the Japanese were out on the open sea, it was nearly dark. Nonetheless, Admiral Yi had the turtle ship and his other vessels turn around quickly and fire upon the Japanese. Admiral Yi had his men unleash a hail of cannonballs and fire arrows. This had an immediate effect on the enemy warships, and the Japanese ships started taking heavy damage.

The fierce and sudden Korean attack shocked the Japanese. But unlike their previous poor performance at the Battle of Okpo, the Japanese soldiers fought bravely and returned fire with their arquebuses in a timely manner. Unfortunately for the Japanese, they did not have a chance to board the Korean ships because of concentrated Korean cannon fire. Also, the turtle ship was impossible to board anyway due to iron spikes on its roof. Then, the Japanese began to panic when the turtle ship smashed into Japanese lines, firing in every direction.

It was in the heat of the battle when the course of Korea's history nearly changed; Admiral Yi was shot by a Japanese arquebusier. The Korean captains were shocked. However, the bullet only punctured the skin of his left arm leaving Admiral Yi with a very minor injury.

Aftermath
In a couple of hours, every single Japanese warship that had fought was destroyed. Yi Sunsin destroyed all the large Japanese ships and left a few small enemy ships behind hoping to lure back the Japanese who had fled. A few survivors struggled ashore. The Battle of Sacheon caused the Japanese command at Busan some anxiety, as the supply ships that sailed from Japan might be in danger.

See also
Battle of Okpo
List of naval battles
Military history of Korea
Military history of Japan
History of Korea

References

Bibliography

 
 
 
 
 
 
  
 
 
 
 桑田忠親 [Kuwata, Tadachika], ed., 舊參謀本部編纂, [Kyu Sanbo Honbu], 朝鮮の役 [Chousen no Eki]　(日本の戰史 [Nihon no Senshi] Vol. 5), 1965.

External links
Battle of Sacheon animated battle map by Jonathan Webb

1592 in Asia
1592 in Japan
Sacheon 1592
History of South Gyeongsang Province
Sacheon 1592
Yi Sun-sin